This is a list of aviation-related events from 1928:

Events 
 The Soviet Unions first five-year plan (1928–1932) begins, placing a high priority on the construction of new aircraft factories. It begins a rapid expansion of the Soviet aircraft industry.
 The Aeromarine Plane and Motor Company renames itself the Aeromarine-Klemm Corporation and begins to produce the German-designed Klemm aircraft.
 The Douglas Company renames itself the Douglas Aircraft Company.
 The Kawanishi Aircraft Company is founded.
 The Mitsubishi Internal Combustion Engine Company Ltd. changes its name to Mitsubishi Aircraft Company Ltd.
 Italy officially records its production rate for military aircraft at 150 per month, with a capacity to expand to 600 per month in wartime. The Regia Aeronautica (Italian Royal Air Force), meanwhile, determines that it will require a production rate of 900 aircraft per month during a war.
 The United States Coast Guard establishes an Aviation Section at its headquarters.
 Frank Hawks makes a nationwide goodwill tour of the United States for Texaco piloting the custom-built Ford Trimotor Texaco One. An estimated 500,000 people see Texaco One, and Hawks carries 7,200 passengers in the plane without mishap.

January
 Hoping to become the first person to fly a small, open-cockpit plane solo from South Africa to London, Mary, Lady Heath, takes off in an Avro Avian for what she hopes will be a three-week trip. Instead, the trip will take three months, and she will not arrive in London until May.
 To advertise Texaco, Frank Hawks flies a Texas delegation in the custom-built Ford Trimotor Texaco One from Houston, Texas, to Mexico City, Mexico. The first goodwill trade extension air tour from the United States to Mexico, the flight receives widespread coverage in American and Mexican newspapers.
 January 6–8 – United States Marine Corps First Lieutenant Christian Schilt makes ten flights in an O2U Corsair to evacuate wounded Marines from an airfield hacked out of the jungle at the village of Quilali, Nicaragua, which is besieged by the guerrilla forces of Augusto César Sandino. Schilt will receive the Medal of Honor for the flights.
 January 10 – John Moncrieff and George Hood disappear attempting the first trans-Tasman Sea flight between Australia and New Zealand in the Ryan B-1 Brougham Aotearoa (registration G-AUNZ). No trace of them or their aircraft ever is found. Theirs is the first aircraft ever to disappear without trace in or near New Zealand.

February
 February 3 – New York City decides to build its first municipal airport.
 February 7–22 – Bert Hinkler makes the first solo flight from England to Australia, flying from Croydon to Darwin in an Avro Avian. His flight sets a new time world record for an England-to-Australia flight of just under 15½ days, smashing the previous record of 28 days. He then flies on to Bundaberg, Queensland, Australia, arriving there on February 27.
 February 12 – Mary, Lady Heath leaves Cape Town in an Avro Avian in an attempt to make the first solo flight by a woman from South Africa to England. She will arrive in Croydon on May 17.
 February 13 – Charles Lindbergh arrives in St. Louis, Missouri, completing a goodwill tour of Latin America at the controls of the Spirit of St. Louis which started with a nonstop flight from Washington, D.C. to Mexico City on December 13–14, 1927, and included stops elsewhere in Mexico and in Guatemala, British Honduras, El Salvador, Honduras, Nicaragua, Costa Rica, Panama, Colombia, Venezuela, the Virgin Islands, Puerto Rico, the Dominican Republic, Haiti, and Cuba.
 February 15 – Aeroput, the flag carrier of the Kingdom of Yugoslavia and Yugoslavia's first civilian airline, makes its first flight, a 2-hour 25-minute trip from Belgrade International Airport in Belgrade to Borongaj Airfield in Zagreb by a Potez 29/2 (registration X-SECD) carrying two pilots and five journalists and news photographers. The airliner makes passes over Zagreb before landing. In the afternoon, the airliner returns to Belgrade, again carrying journalists as passengers.

March
 March 1 – The British aircraft carrier HMS Courageous enters service as the worlds first aircraft carrier with transverse arresting gear.
 March 12 – Attempting to set a new world airspeed record, South African pilot Flight Lieutenant Samuel M. "Kinky" Kinkead, commander of the Royal Air Force High Speed Flight and a decorated World War I flying ace, dies when his Supermarine S.5 seaplane, N221, suddenly nose-dives into the Solent off Englands Isle of Wight.
 March 26 – The Italian Secretary of State for Air, Italo Balbo, founds the airline Società Aerea Mediterranea (SAM) as an early step toward an Italian Fascist government takeover of all Italian airlines and rationalization of their routes.
He flies a Macchi M.52bis.

April
 The Imperial Japanese Navy begins to experiment with coordinated torpedo attacks by aircraft and surface ships. It will not abandon the concept as impractical until the mid-1930s.
 April 1 – The Imperial Japanese Navy forms its first seagoing aircraft carrier organization, the First Carrier Division.
 April 13 – The first non-stop flight across the Atlantic Ocean from east to west is made by Hermann Köhl,  Ehrenfried Günther Freiherr von Hünefeld, and Major James Fitzmaurice in a Junkers W.33 named Bremen.
 April 14 – In the Breguet 19 G.R. Nungesser-Coli, the French aviators Dieudonné Costes and Joseph Le Brix complete a round-the-world flight they had begun on October 10, 1927, traveling  with a total flying time of 350 hours, although they have covered the segment between San Francisco, California, and Tokyo, Japan, aboard ship. Their route has taken them from Paris to Senegal, Argentina, Brazil, the United States, Japan, India, Greece, and back to Paris, and has included the first aerial crossing of the South Atlantic Ocean and flights to every country in South America.
 April 25 – Floyd Bennett, after whom Floyd Bennett Field was named, died in Quebec City of pneumonia, developed during a rescue flight to Greenly Island, in the Strait of Belle Isle northwest of Newfoundland, to save the crew of the German airplane Bremen, which had crash-landed after flying the Atlantic.
 April 27 – Regia Aeronautica (Italian Royal Air Force) General Alessandro Guidoni is killed at Montecelio, Italy, when a new model of parachute he personally is testing fails. In 1937, the town and surrounding comune will be renamed Guidonia Montecelio in his honor.

May
 During the month, Sumitoshi Nakao becomes the first Japanese aviator to save his life by parachute when he bails out of one of two Mitsubishi 1MF2 Hayabusa-type fighter prototypes when it disintegrates during a diving test during official Imperial Japanese Army trials at Tokorozawa. He is uninjured.
 During the month, brothers Thomas Elmer Braniff and Paul Revere Braniff found their first airline, Tulsa-Oklahoma City Airline. It is owned by Paul R. Braniff, Inc.
 May 1 – When a United States Army Air Corps Curtiss O-1B Falcon carrying Thaddeus C. Sweet, a member of the United States House of Representatives representing New York's 32nd Congressional District, lands in a field near Whitney Point, New York, to escape a thunderstorm, it somersaults, killing Sweet. The pilot is uninjured.
 May 3–5 – Imperial Japanese Army Air Corps aircraft see action in China during the Tsinan Incident.
 May 11 – The Ryan NYP Spirit of St. Louis, in which Charles Lindbergh had made the first non-stop transatlantic flight in May 1927, goes on display in the Smithsonian Institution′s Arts and Industries Building in Washington, D.C. It will remain there until 1975, when it is removed for cleaning and restoration before going on display in the Smithsonian's new National Air and Space Museum that opens in Washington, D.C., in July 1976. 
 May 15 – The Reverend John Flynn founds the Royal Flying Doctor Service of Australia at Cloncurry, Queensland, Australia, using a de Havilland DH.50. The service takes medical services to remote parts of the Australian bush.
 May 17
Mary, Lady Heath, arrives at Croydon Aerodrome in London, completing a 9,000-mile (14,500-kilometer) flight from South Africa in an Avro Avian, stepping out of the cockpit to greet a cheering crowd wearing a pleated skirt, high heels, a fur coat, and a cloche hat. When she had begun the journey in South Africa in January, she had hoped to complete the flight in three weeks, but various setbacks – including a crash-landing outside Southern Rhodesia after she suffered heat stroke – have led to the trip taking three months. She becomes the first person to fly from South Africa to London solo in a small, open-cockpit plane.
During Fleet Problem VIII, the United States Navy aircraft carrier  launches 35 aircraft off the Hawaiian Islands which carry out a successful simulated surprise "attack" against United States Army defenders in the Territory of Hawaii. It is the first in a series of U.S. Navy exercises experimenting with the use of carrier aircraft in surprise attacks against enemy ports and bases.
 May 23 – With Umberto Nobile in command, the Italian airship Italia sets out on her ill-fated third Arctic flight, during which she will fly over the North Pole. Italia will crash on her way back.
 May 25 – Sixty-one Regia Aeronautica (Italian Royal Air Force) seaplanes – 51 Savoia-Marchetti S.59bis and 10 Savoia-Marchetti S.55s – led by General Italo Balbo set out from Orbetello, Italy, on a six-stage, mass-formation flight circuiting the Western Mediterranean. The flight is intended to improve the operational skills of Regia Aeronautica aircrews and ground crewmen, showcase the Italian aviation industry to potential foreign buyers of Italian-made aircraft, and enhance the prestige of Benito Mussolinis Italian Fascist government.

June
 June 2 – Sixty-one Regia Aeronautica (Italian Royal Air Force) seaplanes – 51 Savoia-Marchetti S.59bis and 10 Savoia-Marchetti S.55s – led by General Italo Balbo return to Italy after a six-stage, 1,750-mile (2,818-km) mass-formation flight circuiting the Western Mediterranean. Since departing Italy on May 25, the aircraft have completed the journey in six segments of three or four hours flying time each. Their stops have included Cagliari, Sardinia; Tortosa, Spain, and Marseilles, France.
 June 3 – Italian aviators Arturo Ferrarin and Carlo Del Prete complete a nonstop flight in the Savoia-Marchetti S.64 begun on May 31 during which they have made 51 round trips between Torre Flavia (in Ladispoli) and Anzio.
 June 9 – Charles Kingsford Smith and his crew make the first flight across the Pacific Ocean in Fokker F.VIIb/3m Southern Cross. They had left Oakland, California on May 31 and reach Brisbane via Honolulu and Fiji. The flight takes 83 hours.
 June 11
At the Wasserkuppe, Alexander Lippisch's Ente becomes as part of Opel RAK program by Max Valier and Fritz von Opel the first aircraft to fly under rocket power, completing a  circuit of the landing strip.
In response to a December 1927 United States-Mexico flight by Charles Lindbergh, Emilio Carranza departs Valbuena Field, Mexico City, Mexico, in The Excelsior-Mexico, a Ryan Brougham B-1, to attempt a non-stop goodwill flight to Washington, D.C. Unable to navigate using U.S. Airmail light beacons because of fog, he instead lands at approximately 3:00 a.m. on June 12 in Mooresville, North Carolina. Carranza departs Mooresville early on the afternoon of June 12 and flies on to Bolling Field in Washington, D.C., where he arrives at about 5:15 p.m. and is greeted by United States Under Secretary of State Robert E. Olds, Mexican Ambassador Manuel C. Tellez, other officials, and spectators. On June 13, he has lunch with President Calvin Coolidge at the Pan American Union Building in Washington, D.C. Later, Carranza flies to Roosevelt Field on Long Island, New York.
 June 17–18 – Aviator Amelia Earhart becomes the first woman to make a successful transatlantic flight, flying as a passenger in a Fokker F.VIIb/3m piloted by Wilmer Stultz from the Dominion of Newfoundland to Wales.
 June 18 – A Latham 47 flying boat carrying Norwegian polar explorer Roald Amundsen and five others on a flight to search for survivors of the Italian airship Italia disappears. Their bodies are never found.
 June 20 – Tulsa-Oklahoma City Airline, the first airline founded by brothers Thomas Elmer Braniff and Paul Revere Braniff, begins operations, using a single, five-passenger Stinson Detroiter to offer service between Oklahoma City, Oklahoma, and Tulsa, Oklahoma.

July
 July 3–5 – Italian aviators Arturo Ferrarin and Carlo Del Prete set a new nonstop flight distance record, flying a Savoia-Marchetti S.64 from Montecelio, Italy, to Brazil. Departing on July 3 and hoping to reach Rio de Janeiro, they are forced to turn back due to bad weather and attempt to land at Natal, Brazil, but their flight ends in a forced landing on a beach at Touros, Brazil, on July 5 after they remain airborne for 48 hours 14 minutes and cover  nonstop.
 July 4 – While crossing the English Channel with several other people during a flight from Croydon, England, to Brussels, Belgium, aboard his private Fokker F.VII trimotor, wealthy Belgian financier Alfred Loewenstein excuses himself to visit the lavatory. When he does not return, his secretary investigates and finds the lavatory empty, the aircraft's adjacent entrance door open, and Loewenstein missing from the plane, having jumped or fallen thousands of feet to his death. His body will be discovered in the sea near Boulogne, France, on July 19.
 July 12 – Mexican aviation pioneer Emilio Carranza is killed in the crash of his Ryan Brougham The Mexico Excelsior in the New Jersey Pine Barrens near Tabernacle, New Jersey, when he flies into a thunderstorm during an attempt to fly non-stop from Roosevelt Field on Long Island, New York, to Mexico City, Mexico.*
 July 13 – The Imperial Airways Vickers Vulcan G-EBLB crashes near Purley, Surrey, in the United Kingdom, during a test flight, killing four of the six people on board. After the crash, Imperial Airways ends the practice of allowing airline staff to take "joy rides" during test flights.
 July 27 – Irish-born aviator Mary, Lady Heath, becomes the first woman appointed as a co-pilot with a civil airline, KLM.

August
 The Daily Mail newspaper fits out a de Havilland DH.61 to use as a mobile press office. It carries its own darkroom and a motorcycle.
 August 1 – A four-man Spanish Air Force crew led by pilot Major Ramón Franco – brother of future Spanish dictator Francisco Franco – and including copilot/navigator Julio Ruiz de Alda Miqueleiz, takes off from Cádiz, Spain, in the Dornier Do R Superwal ("Super Whale") flying boat Numancia to attempt a 20-stage, 25,000-mile (40,258-km) westward flight around the world, heading for their first stop at the Azores. Mechanical problems force Franco to make an emergency landing on the Gulf of Cádiz off Faro, Portugal, and the attempt is scrubbed.
 August 8 – The Couzinet 27 Arc en Ciel II crashes in France during trials. Its mechanic dies instantly and its pilot dies of his injuries a few days later, leaving only survivor of the crash.
 August 11 – Only a little over five weeks after completing their record-breaking Italy-Brazil flight, Italian aviators Arturo Ferrarin and Carlo Del Prete are injured in the crash during a demonstration flight of a Savoia-Marchetti SM.62 flying boat during ongoing post-flight celebrations in Brazil. Del Prete will die of his injuries on August 16.
 August 19 – The Italian Fascist leader Italo Balbo is given the rank of general of the air force in the Regia Aeronautica (Italian Royal Air Force).

September
 September 10–11 – Charles Kingsford Smith and crew make the first successful trans-Tasman flight.
 September 18 – Don Juan de la Cierva flies a Cierva C.8 autogyro from Croydon, England, to Le Bourget, France, making the first crossing of the English Channel in a rotary wing aircraft.

October
Temperatures of –61 C (–71 F) freeze the controls, preventing Streett from losing altitude or turning off the engine; he waits 20 minutes for the engine to run out of gasoline (petrol), then glides to a deadstick landing.
 October 11 – The Zeppelin Graf Zeppelin completes a crossing of the Atlantic Ocean in 71 hours.

November
 The Aeronautical Corporation of America is incorporated at Cincinnati, Ohio. It will change its name to Aeronca Aircraft Corporation in 1941.
 November 24 – María Bernaldo de Quirós becomes the first woman in Spain to be awarded a pilot's licence.

December
 December 6 – North American Aviation Inc. is founded.
 December 12 – Royal Air Force Vickers Victorias evacuate British civilians from Kabul, Afghanistan.
 December 15–17 – French aviators Dieudonné Costes and Paul Codos set a world distance record for flight over a closed circuit, flying .
 December 19 – Harold Pitcairn flies his first autogyro.
 December 20 – Pilot Carl Ben Eielson carries explorer Hubert Wilkins in the first extended flight over Antarctica, using Lockheed Vega Los Angeles flying from Deception Island.

First flights 
 Bellanca CH-200
 Blackburn Lincock
 Couzinet 27 Arc en Ciel II 
 Curtiss P-5 Superhawk
 Dewoitine D.27
 Farman F.160
 Farman F.190
 Focke-Wulf S 2
 Focke-Wulf S 24
 Kreider-Reisner Challenger, first version of the Fairchild KR-34
 Kreider-Reisner KR-21-A, first version of the Fairchild 21
 Latécoère 32
 Levasseur PL.8
 Peyret-Abrial A-5 Rapace
 Piaggio P.8
 Pitcairn PA-6 Super Mailwing
 Potez 32
 Potez 33
 Potez 35
 Westland-Hill Pterodactyl Mk. IA
 Yokosuka K2Y
 Mid-1928 – Stinson Junior
 Autumn 1928 – Polikarpov R-5
 Late 1928 – Saunders A.14

January
 Command-Aire 3C3
 Eberhart XF2G
 January 7 – Polikarpov Po-2
 January 30 – Westland Witch

February
 February 21 – Polikarpov I-3
 February 24 – Handley Page Hare

March
 March 5 - Beardmore Inflexible

April
 Curtiss XP-3A, prototype of the Curtiss P-3 Hawk
 Mitsubishi MC-1

May
 Kawanishi K-12 Sakura ("Cherry Blossom")
 Mitsubishi 1MF2 Hayabusa
 Sikorsky S-38
 May 7 – Couzinet 10 Arc en Ciel
 May 22 – Blériot 175

June
Hawker Hart
June 24 – Boeing XF4B-1, prototype of the Boeing F4B

July
Avro 604 Antelope
 July 27 – Boeing 80

August
 Levasseur PL.7

September
 Boeing XP-7
 September 18 – LZ 127 Graf Zeppelin

October
 October 4 – Butler Blackhawk
 October 23 – Cierva C.17

November
 Cessna CW-6
 Curtiss XF8C-2, prototype of the Curtiss F8C Helldiver, the first United States Navy dive bomber designed as such
Hawker Tomtit
 November 14 – Fairey Long-Range Monoplane

December
 December 7 - De Havilland Hawk Moth

Entered service

January
 Curtiss F8C-1 Falcon with United States Marine Corps Observation Squadrons 8 and 10.

May
 Junkers G.31 with Deutsche Luft Hansa

June
 Westland Wapiti with No. 84 Squadron, Royal Air Force

August
 Boeing F3B with the United States Navy

September
 September 20 – Boeing 80 with Boeing Air Transport

December
 Curtiss F7C Seahawk with United States Marine Corps Fighter Squadron 5 (VF-5M)

Retirements 
 Westland Wizard

References 

 
Aviation by year